Michael Luke Mejares (born June 26, 1975) is a Filipino singer and songwriter of African-American descent.

Life
Mejares was born in Manila, to a Boholana mother, Elvira P. Mejares, and an African-American father named Robert Davis. His biological father left him when Mejares was still young and grew up with a stepfather named Leonides S. Mejares in Tagbilaran, Bohol. Mejares studied elementary and high school in University of Bohol in Tagbilaran City, while he completed Bachelor of Arts in English major in Marketing Studies at University of San Jose – Recoletos in Cebu City.

Works
He was chosen as the new vocalist of neo-soul band, South Border in 1998 replacing Brix Ferraris, but he decided to pursue his solo career in 2002. He was also one of the co-hosts of Sabado Boys, a weekly musical talk show on TV5.

Luke Mejares also joined the fraternity for youth, the Order of Demolay in his native of Tagbilaran City, Bohol.

In 2017, Mejares was named as board member of the Movie and Television Review and Classification Board (MTRCB).

The same year Luke signed with Homeworkz Music and released all original album called Black Bird.  The first singles launched were Funk Whatcha Heard and Aaminin Ko Sayo.

Discography

Albums
 2004: Stop, Luke and Listen
 2007: Pangako
 2012: Kasayaw
 2017: Blackbird

Awards and nominations

References

External links
Luke Mijares makes you ?Stop, Look and Listen!? Manila Bulletin article
Sony Music profile
 

Filipino people of African-American descent
Filipino contemporary R&B singers
21st-century Filipino male singers
Filipino songwriters
People from Tagbilaran
Singers from Bohol
Living people
1975 births
Duterte administration personnel